Federal Correctional Institution, Tallahassee (FCI Tallahassee), is a low security United States federal prison for female inmates in Tallahassee, Florida with a designed designated capacity of 812. It is operated by the Federal Bureau of Prisons, a division of the Department of Justice. The facility also has an adjacent detention center that houses administrative security level male inmates.

History

2006 shootings
On June 21, 2006 at 7:42 a.m. local time, Federal Bureau of Investigation and United States Department of Justice Office of the Inspector General agents attempted to arrest six correctional officers in connection with a corruption investigation into correctional officers trading drugs and other contraband for sex with female inmates. 

One of the correctional officers, Ralph Hill, used a personal handgun and opened fire on the agents. The shooting began in the lobby of the building and moved into the courtyard near the US 319 highway. Hill killed William "Buddy" Sentner, an agent with the DOJ Office of Inspector General. Agents killed Hill. A lieutenant with the Federal Bureau of Prisons was injured in the shooting and transported to Tallahassee Memorial Hospital.

The federal officers were unarmed at the time and the correctional officers were supposed to have been unarmed as well. Michael Folmar, the FBI's special agent in charge in Jacksonville, said "This arrest situation was done in a manner to be very controlled ... where nobody would have any weapons, and we could take this down so there wouldn't be any violence, and this is exactly how it would be handled normally across the United States." The officers to be arrested, Alfred Barnes, Gregory Dixon, Alan Moore, and E. Lavon Spence were transported to Wakulla County Jail south of Tallahassee. Vincent Johnson, the last officer named in the indictment, was not involved in the sexual misconduct, but was alleged to have illegally influenced the prisoners to engage in the behavior.

All five surviving guards were convicted and sentenced to one year in prison plus three months probation in January/February 2007. However, Spence, who had suffered a stroke, was re-sentenced to one year home detention plus three months probation. The case did bring about metal detector screening and bag searches of guards coming to work - which was and is still strongly opposed by the guards' union.

Notable inmates

See also 
 List of U.S. federal prisons

References

External links 
 

Buildings and structures in Tallahassee, Florida
Tallahassee
Tallahassee, Federal Correctional
Tallahassee, Federal Correctional